The Zambian ambassador in Moscow is the official representative of the Government in Lusaka to the Government of Russia.

Resident in Moscow, he has concurrent accreditation as ambassador of Zambia to Albania, Armenia, Azerbaijan, Belarus, Georgia (country), Kazakhstan, Kyrgyzstan, Moldova, Tajikistan, Turkmenistan, Ukraine and Uzbekistan.

List of representatives 

Russia–Zambia relations

References 

 
Zambia
Russia